Tarzan and the Golden Lion is a 1927 American Tarzan film directed by J. P. McGowan based on the 1923 novel of the same name written by Edgar Rice Burroughs. It stars James Pierce as Tarzan, Frederick Peters as Esteban Miranda, Dorothy Dunbar as Jane, and Edna Murphy as Betty Greystoke. It also stars Boris Karloff as Owaza, a tribesman. The film was distributed by the Film Booking Offices of America.

Cast
 James Pierce as Tarzan
 Frederick Peters as Esteban Miranda, villain
 Edna Murphy as Betty Greystoke, Tarzan's sister
 Harold Goodwin as Jack Bradley
 Dorothy Dunbar as Jane Porter Clayton, Lady Greystoke, Tarzan's wife
 D'Arcy Corrigan as Weesimbo
 Boris Karloff as Owaza
 Robert Bolder as John Peebles

Production
Tarzan and the Golden Lion was Pierce's only on-screen appearance as Tarzan. The next year, he married the daughter of Edgar Rice Burroughs, and the two went on to perform the voices of Tarzan and Jane in a Tarzan radio series from 1932 to 1936.

Preservation status
Considered a lost film for many decades - with Pierce trying in vain to locate a copy before his death - a complete print of the film was discovered in the 1990s.

References

External links

Stills and lobby cards at ERBzine.com

1927 films
1920s fantasy adventure films
American black-and-white films
American sequel films
American silent feature films
Film Booking Offices of America films
Films directed by J. P. McGowan
Tarzan films
1920s rediscovered films
American fantasy adventure films
Rediscovered American films
1920s English-language films
1920s American films
Silent adventure films